The Australian Public Service Commissioner is an official appointed by the Australian Government to take a leading role ensuring the Australian Public Service has adequate organisational and workforce capability. Until 1987 the Australian Public Service Commission was called the Public Service Board.

List of commissioners

Inaugural Public Service Commissioner
Duncan McLachlan (1902–1916)

Original appointments to the Public Service Board (1923)
William Skewes (1923–1931)
John Patrick McGlinn (1923–1930)
Brudenell White (1923–1928)

Commissioners on the Public Service Board
John McLaren (1928)
William Clemens (1929–1931)

Sole Public Service Commissioners
William Clemens (1931–1937)
Frank Thorpe (1937–1947)

Chairmen of the Public Service Board
William Dunk (1947–1960)
Frederick Wheeler (1961–1971)
Alan Cooley (1971–1977)
Mick Shann (1977–1978
William Cole (1978–1983)
Peter Wilenski (1983–1987)

Australian Public Service Commissioners
John Enfield (1987–1990)
Dennis Ives (1990–1995)
Peter Shergold (1995–1998)
Helen Williams (1998–2002)
Andrew Podger (2002–2004)
Lynelle Briggs (2004–2009)
Steve Sedgwick (2009–2014)
John Lloyd (2014–2018)
Peter Woolcott (2018–)

References

 
Australian Public Service